Counterfactual is counterfactual conditional, a conditional containing an if-clause which is contrary to fact.

Counterfactual may also refer to:

Arts and social science
 Counterfactual thinking, in psychology
 Counterfactual thought experiments, in philosophy, science, etc.
 Counterfactual history, in historiography
 Alternate history, a literary genre
 Counterfactual subjunctive, grammatical forms which in English are known as the past and pluperfect forms of the English subjunctive mood

Physics
 Counterfactual definiteness, in quantum theory
 Elitzur–Vaidman bomb tester, in quantum theory (counterfactual measurements)

fr:Contrafactualité